Krzysztof Ulatowski (born 25 July 1980) is a former Polish footballer.

Career

In his youth, Ulatowski played for Orkan Ligota Piękna and Parasol Wrocław. Then he moved to his first senior club Polonia Trzebnica. Next he played for Inkopax Wrocław. In 2002, he moved to Śląsk Wrocław. In 2003-2004 he played in Zagłębie Lubin. In 2004, he moved to Śląsk Wrocław. In January 2011, he was loaned to MKS Kluczbork.

References

External links
 

1980 births
Polish footballers
Zagłębie Lubin players
Śląsk Wrocław players
MKS Kluczbork players
Chrobry Głogów players
Living people
People from Trzebnica
Sportspeople from Lower Silesian Voivodeship
Association football midfielders